Massimiliano Fusani (born 17 July 1979 in Aosta) is an Italian former professional footballer who played as central midfielder.

He started playing football as goalkeeper, wanting to imitate his idol Dino Zoff. His goalkeeping career did not last very long, however. When he was 16, he moved to Inter.

He was loaned to Brescello then sold to Perugia in Co-ownership deal.

Honours
 Intertoto Cup 2003 with Perugia
 Serie C1 2007–08 with Sassuolo

References

External links
 Massimiliano Fusani player info at the official Sassuolo website 

Living people
1979 births
Italian footballers
Association football midfielders
Serie A players
Serie B players
Serie C players
Inter Milan players
A.C. Perugia Calcio players
A.C. ChievoVerona players
Modena F.C. players
S.S.C. Bari players
U.S. Sassuolo Calcio players
People from Aosta